The Men's Shot Put F32 had its Final held on September 8 at 17:05.

Medalists

Results

References
Final

Athletics at the 2008 Summer Paralympics